The Ottoman title of kapıcıbaşı designated the chief of the palace gatekeepers, or "chief warder". In the early phase of Ottoman statehood there was one single title-holder. It multiplied over time and there were in the 18th century some 150 simultaneous title-holders. The holder supervised the palace gatekeepers (kapıcılar), was in charge of guarding the gates, transmitted messages and orders, and executed Imperial Council orders.

Notable people
Fatsali Ahmed Aga Canikli 
Abdulfettah Capanoglu
Kara Musa Pasha
Suleyman Bey Capanoglu
Çoban Mustafa Pasha
Battal Huseyin Bey Canikli
Koca Mustafa Pasha
Kurd Mehmed Pasha
Izzet Ahmed Pasha
Mustafa Capanoglu
Topal Osman Pasha
Piali Pasha
Keki Abdi Pasha

References

Ottoman titles
Royal guards
Ottoman court